Aptikovo (Äptek) is a rural locality (a village) in Urman-Bishkadaksky Selsoviet, Ishimbaysky District, Bashkortostan, Russia. The population was 243 as of 2010. There are 3 streets.

Geography 
Aptikovo is located 23 km east of Ishimbay (the district's administrative centre) by road. Novoaptikovo is the nearest rural locality.

References 

Rural localities in Ishimbaysky District